This is a list of films which have placed number one at the weekly box office in Italy during 1992. Amounts are in lire and are based on a sample of key cities.

Highest-grossing films
Highest-grossing films in Italy to 13 December 1992

See also
 Lists of box office number-one films

References

1992
Italy
Box